The Federation of International Polo (FIP) is the international federation representing the sport of polo, officially recognized by the International Olympic Committee. It was founded in 1982 by representatives of eleven national polo associations, and it currently represents the national polo associations of more than 80 countries. FIP's principal aim is to enhance the image and status of the game of polo internationally.

Mission
FIP's mission is to promote the practice of the sport of polo worldwide in order to defend and ensure the spirit of fair play and moral fortitude, with the objective of forming the sporting attitude of gentlemanly behaviour during and after the game, on the playing fields and wherever polo players should meet, so as to form one great world polo family.

In addition to organising international tournaments, FIP develops international tournaments for children, conducts umpiring and coaching seminars and encourages participation in the sport of polo at all levels and ages and produces the International Rules of Polo through a cooperative agreement with the Asociación Argentina de Polo, the Hurlingham Polo Association of Great Britain and Ireland, plus the United States Polo Association.

Events
 World Polo Championship (Only For Men)
 Polo at the Summer Olympics
 Polo at the Pan American Games
 Polo at the 2007 Southeast Asian Games
 Polo at the 2017 Southeast Asian Games
 Polo at the 2019 Southeast Asian Games
 FIP Snow Polo World Cup Invitational
 FIP European Polo Championships
 FIP Ladies European Polo Championship
 FIP Super Nations Cup
 FIP Ambassador's Cup
 FIP Children's Championships

No FIP Events
 PIPA Snow Polo World Cup Tour
 PIPA Beach Polo World Series
 Ezra Cup
 Mannheim May Market

Members

Types
Full Members :
Category A: Countries where polo is more developed. 
Category B: Countries with More than 100 registered players excluding “A” Category. 
Category C: Countries Up to 100 registered players excluding “B” Category.
Corresponding Members
Contact Members

Zones
Zone A - North and Central America - 11 Member
Zone B – South America - 10 Member
Zone C – Europe - 28 Member
Zone D – East Asia and Oceania - 12 Member
Zone E – Africa and West Asia - 21 Member

Countries

Types
 Full Member: 48
 Full Member – A: 4
 Full Member – B: 14
 Full Member – C: 30
 Corresponding Member: 22
 Contact Member: 12

List
Argentina / Full Member – A / Zone B
Australia / Full Member – B / Zone D
Austria / Full Member – A / Zone B
Azerbaijan / Corresponding Member / Zone C
Bahamas / Corresponding Member / Zone A
Barbados / Corresponding Member / Zone A
Belgium / Full Member – C / Zone C
Bolivia / Contact Member / Zone B
Brazil / Full Member – B / Zone B
Brunei / Corresponding Member / Zone D
Canada / Full Member – B / Zone A
Chile / Full Member – B / Zone B
China / Full Member – C / Zone D
Colombia / Corresponding Member / Zone B
Costa Rica / Full Member – C / Zone A
Czech Republic / Corresponding Member / Zone C
Dominican Republic / Corresponding Member / Zone A
Ecuador / Corresponding Member / Zone B
Egypt / Full Member – C / Zone E
El Salvador / Contact Member / Zone A
England / Full Member – A / Zone C
Finland / Corresponding Member / Zone C
France / Full Member – B / Zone C
Germany / Full Member – B / Zone C
Guatemala / Full Member – C / Zone A
Hong Kong / Contact Member / Zone D
Hungary / Contact Member / Zone C
India / Full Member – B / Zone E
Indonesia / Full Member - C / Zone D
Iran / Full Member – B / Zone E
Ireland / Full Member – C / Zone C
Italy / Full Member – B / Zone C
Jamaica / Corresponding Member / Zone A
Japan / Full Member – C / Zone D
Jordan / Corresponding Member / Zone E
Kazakhstan / Full Member – C / Zone C
Kenya / Corresponding Member / Zone E
Korea / Corresponding Member / Zone D
Kuwait / Full Member – C / Zone E
Lebanon / Corresponding Member / Zone E
Liechtenstein / Contact Member / Zone C
Luxembourg / Contact Member / Zone C
Malaysia / Full Member – B / Zone D
Malta / Corresponding Member / Zone C
Mexico / Full Member – B / Zone A
Monaco / Full Member – C / Zone C
Mongolia / Full Member – C / Zone D
Morocco / Full Member – C / Zone E
Netherlands / Full Member – C / Zone C
New Zealand / Contact Member / Zone E
Nicaragua / Corresponding Member / Zone A
Nigeria / Full Member – B / Zone E
Norway / Contact Member / Zone C
Oman / Full Member – C / Zone E
Pakistan / Full Member – C / Zone E
Paraguay / Full Member – C / Zone B
Peru / Full Member – C / Zone B
Philippines / Full Member – C / Zone D
Poland / Contact Member / Zone C
Portugal / Full Member – C / Zone C
Qatar / Corresponding Member / Zone E
Romania / Contact Member / Zone C
Russia / Full Member – C / Zone C
San Marino / Corresponding Member / Zone C
Saudi Arabia / Full Member – C / Zone E
Singapore / Full Member – C / Zone D
Slovakia / Full Member – C / Zone C
South Africa / Corresponding Member / Zone E
Spain / Full Member – B / Zone C
Sweden / Full Member – C / Zone C
Switzerland / Full Member – B / Zone C
Thailand / Full Member – C / Zone D
Tunisia / Corresponding Member / Zone E
Turkey / Corresponding Member / Zone C
Uganda / Contact Member / Zone E
Ukraine / Full Member – C / Zone C
United Arab Emirates / Full Member – C / Zone E
Uruguay / Full Member – C / Zone B
USA / Full Member – A / Zone A
Uzbekistan / Full Member – C / Zone E
Zambia / Contact Member / Zone E
Zimbabwe / Corresponding Member / Zone E

History

The Federation of International Polo (FIP) was created by Marcos Uranga, on November 25, 1982, in Buenos Aires, Argentina by representatives of the national polo associations of Argentina, Brazil, Colombia, Chile, El Salvador, France, Italy, Mexico, Peru, Spain and Zimbabwe. The principal aim was to enhance the image and status of the great game of polo at the international level and return it to its former Olympic glory.

It is a non-profit organization, registered in the Republic of Uruguay at the Ministry of Education and Culture, under number 945425, governed by Uruguayan laws. It is known as the "Federation of International Polo", "Federación Internacional de Polo" in Spanish, and the abbreviation "FIP".

The Federation of International Polo was accepted as a full member of the GAISF (General Association of International Sports Federations) in October 1992 at the General Assembly in Monaco. (GAISF changed its name to "SportAccord" in April 2009).

In 1978, Uranga organized the first International Polo Tournament for Clubs. It was held in Buenos Aires, with representatives from polo clubs around South America participating.

Inspired by the success of the tournament, Uranga started entertaining the idea of competitions between countries. Thus, the first seeds of the idea of the Federation of International Polo were planted in his mind.

By the early 1980s, motivated by the desire to broaden the scope of international polo, as well as to reinstate its Olympic status, Uranga, who would later become President of the Argentine Polo Association, suggested that an international organization should be set up among the polo playing countries of the world.

Uranga and Holden had become firm friends by then, and Uranga shared with his friend the idea of a polo organization and asked him if he would help get different countries involved to get back in the Olympics and to spread the espirit de corps. "It will never work, but I'll help", was Holden's pessimistic response. But after making initial contact the invincible two-man team had enlisted a dozen countries and got Uranga's dream underway.

The initial meeting took place in Buenos Aires and by April 1982, the Federation of International Polo, quickly known as "FIP", was created with the polo associations of twelve countries. The headquarters were in Argentina because it was considered the country with the most experience in organizing tournaments. It was also ideal for polo practice, had abundant horses and had many foreigners coming each year for the Argentine Open. Uranga was FIP's first president, a position he tirelessly held for 15 years.

In December 1982, the Argentine Polo Association invited all the national associations of the twelve countries to a meeting. This was to set up an international group that would promote international competitions, obtain recognition from the Olympic Committee, unify the rules of the game, develop the game across the globe, and support the breeding of polo ponies. So it was that FIP became official.

At the time of FIP's founding, Uranga said one of his primary objectives was to bring polo players together to enhance polo, a goal he has strived for and achieved time and time again.

"The original idea of FIP was not just one thing, it was putting together lots of little things in heterogeneous places and very different people ranging from great players to low handicap players, with a different spirit and different situation", Uranga said.

In 1997, Uranga stepped down as FIP President, although he remained extremely active in FIP. The Federation chose its second president, Glen Holden, a former US ambassador and one of FIP's founders. 

World Championships Timeline

European Championships

Men
The European Championship is a 6–8 goal tournament for all European FIP member countries. It was introduced in 1993 based on an idea by Reto Gaudenzi, the Swiss Founder Ambassador of FIP who also created the St. Moritz Snow Polo Tournament. The European Championship's handicap provides an opportunity for European players and patrons to participate in a FIP event and represent their country. Thanks Piero Dillier's hard work as zone C director this event has grown in popularity each year; it helps the sport to grow and also to increase the number of players. The European Championship is unique in the world thanks to the close proximity of the European countries, which makes it easier for all national federations to send ponies and players to the host country, ensuring the championship is of a very special quality and a unique display of international competition. It is the most valuable tournament after the World Polo Championships because of its history, participants and people involved.
In 2018, during the XII FIP European Polo Championship and II FIP Ladies European Polo Championship, both at the Villa a Sesta Polo Club in Italy, the organization achieved a record attendance of European polo teams and countries.

Men's Medals (1993–2021)

Women
2017 – Chantilly, France – 4 teams
Winner: Italy
Runner up: France
Germany (3rd) and England (4th)

2018 – Villa a Sesta, Italy – 4 teams
Winner: Germany
Runner up: Italy
Netherlands (3rd) and France (4th)

2021 III FIP Ladies European Polo Championship
La Mimosa Polo Club, Italy
4 teams: Italy, Germany, Great Britain, Ireland
Winner: Italy
Runner up: England
Ireland (3rd) and Germany (4th)

Women's Medals (2017–2021)

Other FIP Tournaments

Children's Polo

Every year FIP, along with the National Polo Federations of the member countries, organizes events for children under 14.
Players arrive a week before the tournament and stay at the homes of the families of the local players who are responsible for them. During the tournament they meet players from other countries and participate in activities to socialize and make new friends. The impact is very positive because the children interact across cultures and learn to embrace their differences. The Polo Training Federation of the US, the Federation of International Polo, and El Dorado member Fred Mannix sponsored one of the first FIP children's tournaments in 1991. The local players invited their rivals to stay in their homes and play against them using their horses.

FIP Snow Polo World Cup Invitational

Although first conceived in 1959, the sport of Snow Polo did not get its official start until 1985 when the first match was played on the frozen surface of Lake St. Moritz in Switzerland. That first game drew only 1,000 spectators, but since then Snow Polo has rapidly gained in popularity. Today it is played not only in Switzerland but also Italy, Austria, France, the United States, Argentina, Russia, Spain and China.

Today, Snow Polo is gaining ground in Asia, most notably in China where the inaugural Snow Polo World Cup Invitational 2012 took place at the Tianjin Goldin Metropolitan Polo Club, as did the following editions. This tournament is played according to FIP snow polo rules.

The venue

The Metropolitan Polo Club, the largest polo facility in China, has been chosen as the venue of this prestigious event. The tournament is hosted by the Equestrian Association of China and the Federation of International Polo (FIP), and is organized by the Tianjin Sports Bureau, the Hong Kong Polo Development and Promotion Federation (HKPDPF) and the Tianjin Polo Association, with support from various sponsors. With up to 260 stables, the Metropolitan Polo Club is the leading polo venue in China. The Club is equipped with three full-size polo fields, two training gallops, one indoor riding school and one outdoor arena that meet or exceed international standards. Each of these facilities has an all-weather Martin Collins surface, making the Metropolitan Polo Club the only polo facility with such a surface in China.

The FIP Snow Polo World Cup Invitational Tournament marks a milestone in FIP's mission to promote the sport worldwide and enhance the image and stature of this great game.

Held at Tianjin Goldin Metropolitan Polo Club, in Tianjin, China.

2012 – Tianjin, China – (12 teams)
Winner – Hong Kong 
Runner up: South Africa
Other teams: England (3rd), Argentina (4th), Australia, Brazil, Chile, Italy, India, USA, New Zealand, France

2013 – Tianjin, China – (12 teams)
Winner – Hong Kong 
Runner up: Argentina
Other teams: England (3rd), South Africa (4th), Australia, Brazil, Chile, Canada, India, USA, France, New Zealand

2014 – Tianjin, China (12 teams)
Winner – England 
Runner up: Hong Kong
Other teams: Australia, Brazil, Canada, Chile, France, Mexico, New Zealand, South Africa, Spain, USA

2015 – Tianjin, China (12 teams)
Winner – Brazil 
Runner up: USA
Other teams: Argentina (3rd), France (4th), Canada, Chile, England, Hong Kong, Mexico, Peru, New Zealand, Spain

2016 – Tianjin, China (6 Teams)
Winner – Hong Kong 
Runner up: England
Other teams: Chile (3rd), Argentina (4th), Canada, France

2017 – Tianjin, China (6 Teams)
Winner – Argentina 
Runner up: Hong Kong
Other teams: South Africa (3rd), England (4th),(5-3) Australia, USA.

FIP Super Nations Cup

Gathering four professional teams from the world's leading polo nations, this 24 goal tournament, one of the highest-goal international tournaments in the world, is held at Tianjin Goldin Metropolitan Polo Club, in Tianjin, China.

2012 – Tianjin, China – (4 teams)
Winner – Argentina 
Runner-up: USA
Other teams: Hong Kong (3rd) and USA (4th)

2013 – Tianjin, China – (4 teams)
Winner – Hong Kong 
Runner-up: England
Other teams: USA (3rd) and Argentina (4th)

2014 – Tianjin, China – (4 teams)
Winner – Hong Kong 
Runner-up: England
Other teams: USA (3rd) and Argentina (4th)

The Ambassador's Cup
FIP Ambassadors work as a liaison between FIP and the individual countries. The position of Ambassador is to represent FIP, its goals and objectives, to his or her own country, and to work on behalf of the Federation in certain countries. The Ambassador is asked to fulfill specific goals set by the FIP President. Ambassadors are expected to support all FIP events with time, effort and horses. The rank of FIP Ambassador was created when the Federation was founded, with the objective of promoting the idea within their own Polo Association and thus increase interest in the sport. The Ambassadors have not only been a great success, in that they have helped to form a splendid international family of goodwill, but also because they help to foster good relations within the international polo community. FIP Ambassadors are instrumental in expanding polo across the globe and getting the FIP message across. “The idea of the Ambassadors was to get people in countries that were troublesome or not joining and get them to represent FIP. That's why they were called ambassadors,” explains Holden. “They are very important people,” he adds.

Within a few years of FIP's foundation, nineteen countries had signed up, with ten more provisional members. The main vehicle for recruiting new member countries was a series of tournaments that became known as Ambassador's Cups. These tournaments originated as a competition for FIP members and collaborators to engage them in the sport of polo beyond organizational issues. At the beginning the proposal was to play polo in different parts of the world, getting to know all the FIP friends and collaborators and inviting new people to start playing, to expand polo across the world.

One of the first Ambassador's Cups was held in Moscow with the idea of reviving the sport, which had been abolished by the Russian Revolution in 1918. The tournament was played as indoor polo in a circus tent since there were no fields. It took a lot of hard work to organize, but since then polo has begun to be played in Russia again and it is still growing.

Women's Nations Cup
WOMEN'S NATIONS CUP – ARGENTINA 2021
The 2021 Women's Nations Cup tournament was played between 12–16 December 2021, and involved three teams: Argentina. England and USA.
 
The tournament was played with a 16-22 handicap at Palermo Polo Fields.

Rosters
England (21)
Georgie Cunningham 0
Steph Haverhals 4
Milly Hine 7
Hazel Jackson 10

USA (21)
Cecelia Cochran 5
Dawn Jones 6
Meghan Gracida 3
Hope Arellano 7

Argentina (22)
Lia Salvo 10
Milagros Sanchez 7
Azucena Uranga 5
Paulina Vasquetto 0

See also

World Polo Championship
Horseball
Association of IOC Recognised International Sports Federations

References

External links
 Official website
 Recent article on polobarn.com
  USPA withdraws from FIP
 HPA withdraws from FIP
 Argentine Polo Assn withdraws from FIP
 https://www.worldpolo.com/
 http://www.argentinapolo.com/gauchos.html
 https://www.poloplus10.com/polo-associations-worldwide/



Polo
Polo organizations
Polo in the United States
Sports organizations established in 1982